The Diocese of Colorado Springs is a Latin Church ecclesiastical territory, or diocese, of the Catholic Church in central Colorado in the United States. St. Mary's Cathedral is the seat of the diocese in Colorado Springs. 

The Diocese of Colorado Springs was established on November 10, 1983. It is a suffragan diocese in the ecclesiastical province of the metropolitan Archdiocese of Denver.

Territory 

Chaffee, Lake, Park, Teller, Douglas, El Paso, Elbert, Lincoln, Kit Carson and Cheyenne.

History

1800 to 1983 
Until the Mexican-American War (1846 to 1849), the Colorado Springs area was controlled by Mexico, with all Catholic missions under the jurisdiction of the Archdiocese of Durango. After the war, the United States assumed control of te region. In 1851, Pope Pius IX created the Apostolic Vicariate of New Mexico, including Colorado.  The Vatican converted the vicariate into the Diocese of Santa Fe in 1853.

In 1868, Pope Pius IX removed territory from the Diocese of Santa Fe and the Diocese of Grass Valley to form the Vicariate Apostolic of Colorado and Utah. In 1870, the pope erected the Vicariate Apostolic of Colorado, covering only the state of Colorado. On August 16, 1887, Pope Leo XIII converted the vicariate into the Diocese of Denver. On November 15, 1941, Pope Pius XII separated territory from the Archdiocese of Denver to form the Diocese of Pueblo.

1983 to present 
Pope John Paul II created the Diocese of Colorado Springs from territory separated from the Archdiocese of Denver and Diocese of Pueblo in 1983. He named Auxiliary Bishop Richard Hanifen of the Archdiocese of Denver as the first bishop of Colorado Springs.

in September 1984, Hanifen designated St. Mary's Church in Colorado Springs as the diocesan cathedral and launched The Catholic Herald, the monthly diocesan newspaper. He emphasized collaboration with the laity, appointing them to leadership positions within the diocese to ease the burden of the clergy. Hanifen also supported ecumenism and interfaith dialogue, co-founding the Center for Christian-Jewish Dialogue in Colorado Springs with Rabbi Howard Hirsch. During Hanifen's nearly two decades as bishop, the number of Catholics and parishes in the diocese nearly doubled.On December 4, 2001, John Paul II appointed Auxiliary Bishop Michael Sheridan of the Archdiocese of St. Louis as coadjutor bishop of the Diocese of Colorado Springs.

When Hanifan retired in 2003 as bishop of Colorado Springs, Sheridan automatically succeeded him. Sheridan retired in 2021; Pope Francis appointed Reverend James R. Golka of the Diocese of Grand Island to replace him. Golka is the current bishop of Colorado Springs

Sexual Abuse 
On October 16, 2020, it was revealed that the three Catholic dioceses in Colorado, including the Diocese of Colorado Springs, had paid $6.6 million in total compensation to 81 victims of clergy sex abuse within the past year,. On December 1, 2020, it was revealed that at least two priests were accused of committing acts of sex abuse while they were serving in the Diocese of Colorado Springs.

Coat of arms
Bishop Robert C. Hannifen, the first bishop of the diocese, designed its coat of arms, shown in the right sidebar at the top of this article, upon its erection in 1984,  The coat of arms features a shield divided vertically into three regions.

 The purple mountain, snowcapped in argent (silver or white), on a blue and green background in the upper region represents Pike's Peak, a focal point of the physical topography of the diocese.  

 The blue and argent ripples spanning the middle region are the heraldic representation of water, signifying the springs that gave their name to the diocesan see. 

 Three interlocking circles of or (gold or yellow) on a blue background in the lower region reflect the concepts of mutuality, community, and prophecy.

Statistics 
The Diocese of Colorado Springs includes 39 parishes with approximately 176,000 Catholics in a total population of 1,102,775.

Bishops
 Richard Charles Patrick Hanifen (1983-2003) 
 Michael John Sheridan (2003–2021)
 James R. Golka (2021-present)

Coadjutor Bishop
 Michael John Sheridan (2001–2003)

See also
 List of the Catholic cathedrals of the United States
 St. Mary's High School (Colorado Springs)

References

External links
Diocese of Colorado Springs Official Site

 
Roman Catholic Ecclesiastical Province of Denver
Catholic Church in Colorado
Religion in Colorado Springs, Colorado
Christian organizations established in 1983
Colorado Springs
Colorado Springs